Kanah is a stream referred to in the Hebrew Bible forming the boundary between Ephraim and Manasseh, from the Mediterranean Sea eastward to Tappuah. It has been identified with the sedgy streams that constitute the Wady Talaik, which enters the sea between Joppa and Caesarea Maritima. The stream rises in the Southwest of Shechem, flows through Wady Ishkar and joining Aujeh, reaches the sea not far to the north of Jaffa. Others identify it with the river Aujeh.

The book of Joshua also refers to a town named Kanah in the north of the territory of the tribe of Asher. About a mile north of this place are many colossal ruins strewn about, and in the side of a neighbouring ravine are figures of men, women, and children cut in the face of the rock and supposed to be of Phoenician origin.

See also
 Wadi Qana, stream in southern Samaria (biblical term), northern West Bank (modern term), generally seen as the biblical 'brook of Kanah'

References
 (Not copied yet, but see p. 403 of 1893 edition at archive.org.)

Hebrew Bible places